"Maailman toisella puolen" is a Finnish-language song by Finnish pop rock band Haloo Helsinki!. Released on 8 April 2011 by EMI Finland as the second single from the band's third studio album III, the song peaked at number three on the Finnish Singles Chart in April 2011 and has sold gold in the country with over 12,000 copies.

Track listing

Charts and certifications

Weekly charts

Year-end charts

Certifications

References

External links
 Official music video of "Maailman toisella puolen" on YouTube

2011 singles
Haloo Helsinki! songs
Finnish-language songs
Songs written by Rauli Eskolin
2011 songs